John James Monohan (21 August 1873 – 27 August 1934) was an Australian rules footballer who played for the Collingwood Football Club in the Victorian Football League (VFL).

Playing career 
Monohan was part of Collingwood's inaugural VFL season, having played four seasons for the club when they were in the Victorian Football Association (VFA). Renowned for his high marking, he was used mainly as a follower and half back.

He was a premiership player with Collingwood in 1896 and 1903, but missed the 1901 Grand Final loss (despite playing every game that season) and the 1902 premiership through injury.

Monohan also captained the Victorian interstate football team between 1903 and 1906. He was the first Collingwood player to play 200 games for the club, with his 236 career games being a club record until it was broken by James "Jock" McHale in the 1915 Grand Final. 

His son, Jack Monohan Jr., played for Collingwood in the 1920s.

Monohan was inducted into the Collingwood Football Club Hall of Fame in 2012, and he was the 53rd Collingwood player to receive the honour.

Umpiring career 
Monohan became a VFL goal umpire in 1913. After umpiring 181 VFL senior matches and three Grand Finals, Monohan retired as an umpire in 1926.

References

External links

 
 

1873 births
1934 deaths
Australian rules footballers from Victoria (Australia)
Australian Rules footballers: place kick exponents
Collingwood Football Club players
Collingwood Football Club Premiership players
Australian Football League umpires
One-time VFL/AFL Premiership players
People from the City of Whittlesea